"Find What You Love and Let It Kill You" may refer to:

Music 
 Find What You Love and Let It Kill You (Jonny Craig album)
 Find What You Love and Let It Kill You (Hurricane No. 1 album)
 "Find What You Love and Let It Kill You", a song by Linus Pauling Quartet
 Find What You Love and Let It Kill You, a 2019 short film